Day of the Panther and Strike of the Panther are two Australian direct-to-video martial arts action films directed by Brian Trenchard-Smith in 1987 starring Edward Stazak as Jason Blade. The films were shot at the same time and released consecutively.

The director described them as a "martial arts adolescent macho adventure, with as much credibly linked non-stop action as possible" starring a lead who is "attractive, has cat-like grace, and, as tends to happen a lot in my movies, gets his shirt off a lot, and has a good set of pectorals."

Plot

Day of the Panther
Jason Blade and Linda Anderson uncover a Triad drug ring involving Jim Baxter. Linda is killed and Jason must infiltrate the drug ring to get revenge.

Strike of the Panther
Jason Blade rescues Julia, the daughter of prominent businessman David Summers, from a brothel in Dalkeith. Blade then forms the Crime Task Force to assist in the capture of Jim Baxter. Baxter kidnaps Gemma Anderson, Blade's girlfriend and wounds her father, William Anderson. Baxter seeks refuge in a deserted power station, wiring it with enough explosives to destroy half of Perth.

Production
The films were created for the international video market and were intended to make a star of Australian martial artist Ed Staszak. They were made entirely with private finance. Production started in March 1987 in Perth and Fremantle, West Australia, under the direction of stunt co-ordinator Peter West. Four days into filming it was felt that a more experienced director was needed, so Brian Trenchard-Smith was brought in at two days' notice.

"It was the toughest rescue job I've ever done," said Trenchard Smith at the time. "The whole shoot was turned upside down."

Trenchard-Smith went straight into shooting a major fight sequence on his first day and made script changes as he went along, including putting in a new pre-credit sequence to establish the relationship between the characters. He also recast several actors, adding John Stanton to the cast. Trenchard Smith:
If you have to spend extra money replacing a director, then you should look at other elements that ought to be changed, otherwise you're just pouring good money after bad... To a certain extent directing the film was a little like directorial theatresports. I would get to a location to work with supporting actors I hadn't yet met to do a scene that had certain problems. I had to do a great deal of thinking on my feet and thinking fast, and still get four minutes of screen time in a day. I was shooting two pictures at once.
There were eight fight scenes in the first film and nine in the second. "While I've made it tough, I haven't made it unpleasant," said the director. "There's no dwelling on gore. People do bleed occasionally but they bleed politely."

Trenchard-Smith said that the film was aimed at the 13- to 20-year-old market:
The dedicated martial arts people are basically the adolescents who want to watch an invincible superhero who's incredibly fast with feet and hands. The audience is primarily male but there is a significant number of females. If the hero is attractive they won't mind watching him either, provided that the violent action is not too brutal.
The film was shot on 16mm and blown up to 35 mm for possible theatrical release before being released on video.

Reception
Trenchard-Smith later claimed that the films sold around the world:
Because there is an audience in every country that will settle for a vaguely coherent story, cliched situations, but regular albeit low budget punch ups. The Panthers were not movies I would have developed this way even on such a low budget, but they were movies I was prepared to rescue to a basic level, so the investors could get their money back. Inevitably I was criticized for decisions I inherited rather than created. And time tends not to be kind to your efforts on fundamentally flawed material anyway. But if you also work as a film doctor between your own productions, that goes with the territory. The main thing is: from an economic standpoint – THE PATIENT LIVED! 

A third film in the series, Escape of the Panther was planned but was not made.

References

External links

Strike of the Panther at Oz Movies
Day of the Panther at Oz Movies

Australian action films
Films directed by Brian Trenchard-Smith
1980s English-language films